The Coca River is a river in eastern Ecuador. It is a tributary of the Napo River. The two rivers join in the city of Puerto Francisco de Orellana.

See also
San Rafael Falls

References

Rivers of Ecuador
Upper Amazon